Breitung Township may refer to:

 Breitung Township, Michigan
 Breitung Township, St. Louis County, Minnesota

Township name disambiguation pages